Michael Luis Dominguez (born September 4, 1953 in Austin, Texas) retired as the Principal Deputy Under Secretary of Defense for Personnel and Readiness within the United States Department of Defense. He has held that position since his confirmation by the United States Senate on July 11, 2006.

Dominguez reports to the Under Secretary of Defense for Personnel and Readiness, and is responsible for "providing staff advice to the Secretary of Defense and Deputy Secretary of Defense for total force management as it relates to manpower; force structure; readiness; reserve component affairs; health affairs; training; and personnel policy and management, including equal opportunity, morale, welfare, recreation, and quality of life matters."

Career
The child of an Air Force servicemember, Dominguez grew up on bases around the world. After graduating in 1975 from the United States Military Academy at West Point, he was commissioned a Second Lieutenant in the United States Army, reported to Vicenza (Italy), then worked varied assignments with the 1st Battalion, 509th Infantry (Airborne) and the Southern European Task Force.

After leaving the military in 1980, Dominguez went into private business and attended the Stanford Graduate School of Business. From June 1983 to September 1988, he worked at the Office of the Secretary of Defense as an analyst for the Program Analysis and Evaluation (PA&E) office.

From October 1988 to September 1991, he was executive assistant to the Assistant Secretary of Defense for PA&E.

Dominguez entered the Senior Executive Service in 1991 as PA&E's Director for Planning and Analytical Support, serving until September 1994. He oversaw DOD's long-range planning forecast and its $12 billion in annual spending on information technology. He also directed the PA&E modernization of computing, communications and modeling infrastructure. He joined the Chief of Naval Operations' staff in October 1994 and helped the U.S. Navy develop multi-year programs and annual budgets. Dominguez left government in April 1997 to become general manager for a technology service organization, Tech 2000 in Herndon, Virginia.

In September 1999, he began work at the Center for Naval Analyses, where he organized and directed studies of public policy and program issues. In January 2001, he rejoined the staff of the Chief of Naval Operations as assistant director for Space, Information Warfare, and Command and Control.

From August 2001 until July 2006, Dominguez served as the Assistant Secretary of the Air Force for Manpower and Reserve Affairs.  That service was interrupted by several months when he served as the acting United States Secretary of the Air Force from March 28 to July 29, 2005.

Education
1975 Bachelor of Science, U.S. Military Academy, West Point
1983 Master of Business Administration, Stanford University
1989 Program for Senior Officials in National Security, Harvard University
1990 Master of Arts, John F. Kennedy School of Government, Harvard University

Awards
1980 Army Commendation Medal
1988 and 1994 Defense Meritorious Civilian Service Medal
1993 Defense Civilian Service Medal
1997 Medal for Superior Civilian Service, Department of the Navy
1998 Presidential Meritorious Executive Rank Award
2005 (twice) and 2006 Air Force Exceptional Civilian Service Medal
2006 Hispanic Engineer National Achievement Awards Conference (HENAAC) Role Model of the Year Award
2010 elected as Fellow of the National Academy of Public Administration.

References

External links

|-

1953 births
Living people
People from Austin, Texas
United States Military Academy alumni
United States Army officers
Stanford Graduate School of Business alumni
Harvard University alumni
Harvard Kennedy School alumni
Florida Republicans
George W. Bush administration personnel
United States Department of Defense officials
United States Secretaries of the Air Force